KKOO (1260 kHz) is a commercial AM radio station licensed to Weiser, Idaho, and serving the Boise metropolitan area. The station is owned by Iliad Media Boise and airs an Classic Hits radio format, focusing on the hits of the 1960s and 70s. KKOO calls itself Kool 101.5, with 101.5 MHz being the dial position of its FM signal in Boise.  The studios and offices are on East Franklin Road in Nampa.

It is powered at 8,400 watts by day.  At night, to avoid interfering with other stations on 1260 AM, it greatly reduces power to 36 watts.  It is also heard on FM translator station 101.5 K268CU in Boise.  It can also be heard on KZMG's second HD Radio digital subchannel, which feeds K268CU.

History

In December 1947, the station first signed on, using the call sign KWEI and broadcasting on 1240 kilocycles. On February 25, 2011, the call letters were changed to KTRP; that March, the station changed to a classic country format. The KWEI call letters returned on March 25, 2014 (swapping with 1450 AM); on April 17, 2014, the station adopted a Spanish language format.

On May 12, 2016, Educational Media Foundation purchased KKOO and KWEI. Both stations became K-Love affiliates and sister stations to Air1 affiliate KARO. EMF took control of both stations on September 1, 2016; that day, KWEI began stunting.

KWEI changed the call letters to KBXN on November 28, 2018.  It changed the call letters to KKOO on March 12, 2019, and picked up the "Kool FM" oldies format from 1380 AM Ontario, Oregon.  The station at 1380 switched its call sign to KBXN and went dark in June 2019.

References

External links

FCC History Cards for KKOO

KOO
Radio stations established in 1947
1947 establishments in Idaho
Weiser, Idaho